"Lord Have Mercy on the Working Man" is a song written by Kostas and recorded by American country music singer Travis Tritt. It was released in August 1992 as the first of five singles from his third studio album, T-R-O-U-B-L-E.  The song became Tritt's tenth entry on the Billboard Hot Country Singles & Tracks (now Hot Country Songs) charts, where it peaked at number 5.

Content
"Lord Have Mercy on the Working Man" is a moderate up-tempo whose lyrics centralize on a theme of economic injustice towards blue collar workers.

The instrumentation features various forms of percussion from Sam Bacco, including crotales, wobble board, spoons and a broom. Richard Bennett and Wendell Cox play guitar solos before the third verse, and Brooks & Dunn, T. Graham Brown, George Jones, Little Texas, Dana McVicker, Tanya Tucker and Porter Wagoner all sing background vocals on the final chorus.

Personnel

 Sam Bacco – bass drum, spoons, wobble board, broom
 Richard Bennett – acoustic guitar, slide guitar
 Mike Brignardello – bass guitar
 Brooks & Dunn – additional backing vocals on final chorus
 T. Graham Brown – additional backing vocals on final chorus
 Larry Byrom – acoustic guitar
 Wendell Cox – electric guitar
 Terry Crisp – pedal steel guitar, resonator guitar
 Stuart Duncan – fiddle
 George Jones – additional backing vocals on final chorus 
 Little Texas – additional backing vocals on final chorus
 Dana McVicker – additional backing vocals on final chorus 
 Matt Rollings – piano
 Jimmy Joe Ruggiere – harmonica
 Steve Turner – drums
 Billy Joe Walker Jr. – acoustic guitar, electric guitar
 Travis Tritt – vocals
 Tanya Tucker – additional backing vocals on final chorus
 Porter Wagoner – additional backing vocals on final chorus
 Dennis Wilson – backing vocals
 Curtis Young – backing vocals

Critical reception
Teresa M. Walker, in her review for the Gainesville Sun, said that with the assistance from superstars on the final chorus, the song "should shoot up the charts." Dave Larsen of the Dayton Daily News cited it as one of the stronger tracks on the album, saying that the album "works best when Tritt sticks with the populist approach." Alanna Nash of Entertainment Weekly said of the song, "Tritt finds a solid image for his laborer's lament[…]But the melody is so slight that he resorts to an acoustic arrangement that evokes Jimmie Rodgers and the young Roy Acuff." Deborah Evans Price, of Billboard magazine gave the song a mixed review, saying that while the final chorus of song features famous country artists, it was too bad that the entire song isn't as strong as the last verse.

Music video
Jack Cole directed the song's music video. In the book Country Music Culture: From Hard Times to Heaven, Curtis W. Ellison wrote that the song's music video "confronted a litany of personal oppressions attributed to government policy" that coincided with Bill Clinton's presidential campaign.

Chart performance
"Lord Have Mercy on the Working Man" spent 20 weeks on the Billboard Hot Country Singles & Tracks (now Hot Country Songs) charts in 1992, peaking at number 5 for the chart dated November 7. The song also reached number 10 on the Canadian RPM Country Tracks charts.

References

1992 singles
Travis Tritt songs
Songs written by Kostas (songwriter)
Warner Records singles
1992 songs